Komor is a surname. It may refer to:

 Agnieszka Gorgoń-Komor (born 1970), Polish politician
 Aleksander Komor (born 1994), Polish footballer
 Michael Komor (born 1960), Welsh Anglican priest
 Paul Komor, Hungarian businessman and diplomat
 Sebastian Komor (born 1976), Polish-Norwegian musician

See also
 
 Komar (surname)

Polish-language surnames